Ardissone is a surname. Notable people with the surname include:

 Francesco Ardissone (1837–1910, Ardiss.), Italian algologist and botanist
 Laura Ardissone (born 1969), Italian sprinter
 Mario Ardissone (1900–1975), Italian footballer
 Yolande Ardissone (born 1927), French painter

See also
 Ardisson